Ayman Klzie, sometimes written as Ayman Kelzi (born 7 January 1993 in Aleppo) is a Syrian swimmer. He represented Syria at the World Aquatics Championships in 2013, 2015, 2017, 2019 and 2022. He also competed at the 2020 Summer Olympics in 200 m butterfly event.

In 2018, he competed in the men's 100 metre butterfly event at the 2018 FINA World Swimming Championships (25 m) held in Hangzhou, China. He also competed in the men's 200 metre butterfly event.

In 2019, he Syria at the represented Syria at the World Aquatics Championships in Gwangju, South Korea. He competed in the men's 100 metre butterfly and men's 200 metre butterfly events and in both events he did not advance to compete in the semi-finals. He also took part in the 2022 World Championships, where he competed in the 50m butterfly event.

References

External links 
 

Living people
1993 births
Sportspeople from Aleppo
Syrian male swimmers
Male butterfly swimmers
Swimmers at the 2014 Asian Games
Asian Games competitors for Syria
Swimmers at the 2020 Summer Olympics
Olympic swimmers of Syria
21st-century Syrian people